Toto and Cleopatra is a 1963 Italian adventure-comedy film written and directed by Fernando Cerchio.

Plot 
Mark Antony has a brother-lookalike, Totonno, a sinister slave trader. Totonno secretly replaces Mark Antony in the most delicate moments. The continuous alternation of the two brothers generates havoc, with  Cleopatra increasingly confused about the contradictory behavior of the man.

Cast 
Totò as Totonno / Mark Antony
 Magali Noël as  Cleopatra
 Franco Sportelli as  Ahenobarbus
 Carlo Delle Piane as  Caesarion
 Moira Orfei as  Octavia
 Lia Zoppelli as  Fulvia
 Gianni Agus as Senator Gaius Octavius
 Toni Ucci as  Senator  Publio Nasone
 Mario Castellani as  Real Surgeon 
 Pietro Carloni as  Lepidus
 Nadine Sanders as  Ancella di Cleopatra
 Ignazio Leone  as  Apollodoro
 Adriana Facchetti as  Publia
 Franco Ressel  as  the Sicilian 
 Dada Gallotti  as  Carmiana

References

External links

1963 films
1960s adventure comedy films
Italian adventure comedy films
Peplum films
Films directed by Fernando Cerchio
Films scored by Carlo Rustichelli
Depictions of Cleopatra on film
Depictions of Mark Antony on film
Depictions of Augustus on film
Italian parody films
Films set in ancient Egypt
Films with screenplays by Giovanni Grimaldi
Sword and sandal films
Cultural depictions of Caesarion
1963 comedy films
1960s Italian-language films
1960s Italian films